Marvel Studios, LLC (originally known as Marvel Films from 1993 to 1996) is an American film and television production company that is a subsidiary of Walt Disney Studios, a division of Disney Entertainment, which is owned by the Walt Disney Company. Marvel Studios produces the Marvel Cinematic Universe (MCU) films and series, based on characters that appear in Marvel Comics publications.

Since 2008, Marvel Studios has released 31 films within the MCU, from Iron Man (2008) to Ant-Man and the Wasp: Quantumania (2023), eight television series since 2021, from WandaVision (2021) to She-Hulk: Attorney at Law (2022), and two television specials, Werewolf by Night (2022) and The Guardians of the Galaxy Holiday Special (2022). The television series What If...? (2021) is the studio's first animated property, created by its "mini-studio" Marvel Studios Animation. These films, television series, and television specials all share continuity with each other, along with the One-Shots short films produced by the studio. The television series produced by Marvel Television also acknowledge the continuity.

The Avengers (2012), Iron Man 3 (2013), Avengers: Age of Ultron (2015), Captain America: Civil War (2016), Black Panther (2018), Avengers: Infinity War (2018), Captain Marvel (2019), Avengers: Endgame (2019), Spider-Man: Far From Home (2019) and Spider-Man: No Way Home (2021) are all among the 50 highest-grossing films of all time, with Avengers: Endgame becoming the highest-grossing film of all time from July 2019 until March 2021. In addition to the MCU, Marvel Studios was also involved with the production of other Marvel-character film franchises that have exceeded $1 billion in North American box office revenue, including the X-Men and Spider-Man multi-film franchises.

Background

Timely era
During what is known as Marvel's Timely era, Captain America was licensed out to Republic Pictures for a serial just for the free advertising. Timely failed to provide any drawing of Captain America with his shield or any further background, and Republic created a whole new background for the character, and portrayed the character using a gun.

Marvel Entertainment Group era
From the late 1970s through the early 1990s, Marvel Comics Group/Marvel Entertainment Group (MEG) sold options to studios to produce films based on Marvel Comics characters. One of Marvel's superheroes, Spider-Man, was optioned in the late 1970s, and rights reverted to Marvel without a film having been produced within the allocated time frame. From 1986 to 1996, most of Marvel's major characters had been optioned, including the Fantastic Four, X-Men, Daredevil, Hulk, Silver Surfer, and Iron Man. Marvel's first big-screen adaptation of one of its properties was the 1986 film Howard the Duck, which was a box-office flop.

MEG was purchased by New World Entertainment in November 1986 and moved to produce films based on the Marvel characters. It released The Punisher (1989) before MEG was sold to Ronald Perelman's Andrews Group. Two other films were produced: Captain America (1990) released in the United Kingdom on screens and direct to video in the United States, and The Fantastic Four (1994), not intended for release.

History

Marvel Films

Following Marvel Entertainment Group's (MEG) ToyBiz deal in 1993, Avi Arad of ToyBiz was named president and CEO of Marvel Films division and of New World Family Filmworks, Inc., a New World Entertainment subsidiary. New World was MEG's former parent corporation and later a fellow subsidiary of the Andrews Group. Marvel Productions became New World Animation by 1993 as Marvel would start up Marvel Films including Marvel Films Animation. Marvel Films Animation shared Tom Tataranowicz with New World Animation as head of development and production. New World Animation (The Incredible Hulk), Saban (X-Men) and Marvel Films Animation (Spider-Man) each produced a Marvel series for television for the 1996–1997 season. It was Marvel Films Animation's only production. By the end of 1993, Arad and 20th Century Fox struck a deal to make a film based on the X-Men.

New World Animation and Marvel Films Animation were sold along with the rest of New World by Andrews Group to News Corporation/Fox as announced in August 1996. As part of the deal, Marvel licensed the rights to Captain America, Daredevil and Silver Surfer to be on Fox Kids Network and produced by Saban. New World Animation continued producing a second season of The Incredible Hulk for UPN.

Marvel Studios
In August 1996, Marvel created Marvel Studios, an incorporation of Marvel Films, due to the sale of New World Communications Group, Inc., Marvel's fellow Andrews Group subsidiary in film and television stations, to News Corporation/Fox. Filing with the U.S. Securities and Exchange Commission to raise money to finance the new corporation, Marvel, Isaac Perlmutter's Zib, Inc. and Avi Arad sold Toy Biz stocks, which Marvel had started and took public in February 1995. Toy Biz filed an offering of 7.5 million shares with a closing price of $20.125 at the time, making the offering worth approximately $150 million. Toy Biz sought to sell 1 million shares, and Marvel sought to sell 2.5 million shares.

Jerry Calabrese, the president of Marvel Entertainment Group and Avi Arad, head of Marvel Films and a director of Toy Biz, were assigned tandem control of Marvel Studios. Under Calabrese and Arad, Marvel sought to control pre-production by commissioning scripts, hiring directors, and casting characters, providing the package to a major studio partner for filming and distribution. Arad said of the goal for control, "When you get into business with a big studio, they are developing a hundred or 500 projects; you get totally lost. That isn't working for us. We're just not going to do it anymore. Period." Marvel Studios arranged a seven-year development deal with 20th Century Fox to cover markets in the United States and internationally. In the following December, Marvel Entertainment Group went through a reorganization plan, including Marvel Studios as part of its strategic investment. By 1997, Marvel Studios was actively pursuing various film productions based on Marvel characters, including the eventual films X-Men (2000), Daredevil (2003), Elektra (2005) and Fantastic Four (2005). Unproduced projects included Prince Namor, based on the character Namor and to be directed by Philip Kaufman, and Mort the Dead Teenager, based on the comic book of the same name and written by John Payson and Mort creator Larry Hama. 
Marvel was developing a Captain America animated series with Saban Entertainment for Fox Kids Network to premiere in fall 1998. However, due to the bankruptcy the series was canceled after only character designs and a one-minute promotional reel were made.

Licensing films
The first film packaged and licensed by Marvel Studios was Blade, based on the vampire hunter Blade. The film was directed by Stephen Norrington and starred Wesley Snipes as Blade. It was released on August 21, 1998, grossing $70,087,718 in the United States and Canada and $131,183,530 worldwide.

Blade was followed by X-Men, which was directed by Bryan Singer and was released on July 14, 2000. X-Men grossed $157,299,717 in the United States and Canada and $296,250,053 worldwide. Blade and X-Men demonstrated that widely popular films could be made out of comic book characters not familiar to the general public.

Leading up to X-Mens release, Marvel Studios negotiated a deal with then-functional Artisan Entertainment, successful with the low-budget The Blair Witch Project, for a co-production joint venture that included rights to 15 Marvel characters including Captain America, Thor, Black Panther, Iron Fist, and Deadpool. Artisan would finance and distribute while Marvel would develop licensing and merchandising tie-ins. The resulting production library, which would also include television series, direct-to-video films and internet projects, would be co-owned. By 2001, the success of Marvel Entertainment's Ultimate Marvel imprint comics created leverage in Hollywood for Marvel Studios, pushing more properties into development.

The next film licensed from Marvel Studios was Spider-Man by Columbia Pictures, directed by Sam Raimi and starring Tobey Maguire as Spider-Man. The film was released on May 3, 2002, grossing $403,706,375 in the United States and Canada and $821,708,551 worldwide. The early success of Spider-Man led the film's studio to issue a seven-figure advance for a sequel. Arad spoke of the deal, "Movies make sequels. Therefore, it's a big economic luxury to know that a movie's going to get a second and third. This is a business of precedence." According to a Lehman Brothers analysis, the Studios made only $62 million for the first 2 Spider-Man movies. Marvel was making more from half the consumer product licensing fees while making relatively little from the movie, but was enough for Marvel to regain its financial footings. In October 2002, Marvel Studios announced deals for Sub-Mariner and Prime with Universal Studios.

In contrast to the original storylines of DC Comics' Superman and Batman films, Marvel films were more directly inspired by their comics, copying from them set pieces, scenes, plots, and dialogue.

In 2003, David Maisel approached Arad about earning Marvel more for their films. Maisel, Arad and Perlmutter met leading to Maisel being hired as president and COO. The studio's office, then on Santa Monica Boulevard, was small with a dozen or so staff members. Kevin Feige, later to become CEO, was then a junior executive generating script notes to the licensed studios. In January 2003, Marvel, the Sci-Fi Channel and Reveille Productions agreed to develop two pilot films based on Brother Voodoo and Strikeforce: Morituri.

Partnering with Lionsgate in 2004, Marvel Studios planned to enter the direct-to-DVD market with eight animated films with Lionsgate Home Entertainment handling distribution. The line was a proof of concept for Maisel's later plan. Eric Rollman was hired by Marvel as Executive Vice President, Home Entertainment & TV Production for Marvel Studios to oversee the deal with Lionsgate.

Production
In 2004, David Maisel was hired as chief operating officer of Marvel Studios as he had a plan for the studio to self-finance movies. Marvel entered into a non-recourse debt structure with Merrill Lynch that was collateralized by certain movie rights to a total of 10 characters from Marvel's vast vault. Marvel got $525 million to make a maximum of 10 movies based on the company's properties over eight years, according to the parameters of the original deal. Those characters were: Ant-Man, The Avengers, Black Panther, Captain America, Cloak & Dagger, Doctor Strange, Hawkeye, Nick Fury, Power Pack and Shang-Chi. Ambac insured the movies would succeed or they would pay the interest payment on the debt and get the movie rights collateral.

Initially Marvel Studios was in talks with Universal Pictures as a possible distributor, as Universal owned the film rights to both Hulk and Namor during that time. Negotiations dragged on, so the studio began talks with Paramount Pictures. In the second quarter of 2005, Merrill attempted to back out of full financing of each movie, demanding that Marvel finance 1/3 of the budget. Marvel took back rights in five foreign territories from Paramount for pre-sell to meet that demand. On September 6, 2005, Marvel announced the Merrill Lynch financing deal with Paramount was on as marketer and distributor. Also, the parent company changed its name from Marvel Enterprises, Inc. to Marvel Entertainment, Inc. to reflect the change to self-production.

The studio moved to a new location over a Mercedes-Benz dealership in Beverly Hills. Maisel was also named vice-chairman of the studio, but reported to Isaac Perlmutter. In October 2005, Michael Helfant joined the studio as president and chief operating officer.

In November 2005, Marvel gained the film rights to Iron Man from New Line Cinema. Marvel revealed that it had regained the film rights to Hulk from Universal in February 2006, in exchange for letting Universal own the distribution rights to The Incredible Hulk and the right of first refusal to pick up the distribution rights to any future Marvel Studios-produced Hulk films. In April 2006, Thor was announced to be a Marvel Studios production. Lions Gate Entertainment subsequently dropped the Black Widow motion picture project it had since 2004 giving the rights back to Marvel.

Maisel and Arad fought over the rate of movie releases and strength of characters in the movie line up. Perlmutter supported Maisel and thus, in May 2006, Arad quit as studio chair and CEO. In March 2007, David Maisel was named chairman and Kevin Feige was named president of production as Iron Man began filming.

In January 2008, Marvel Animation was incorporated to direct Marvel's efforts in animation and home entertainment markets including then animation efforts with Lionsgate and Nickelodeon. The company in March agreed to a five picture basic cable distribution with FX for Iron Man and The Incredible Hulk movies with the additional movies to be named later. In November, Marvel Studios signed a lease with Raleigh Studios to host its headquarters and production offices and film the next four movies on the studios' slate, including Iron Man 2 and Thor, at their Manhattan Beach facilities. By September 2008, Paramount added to its domestic film distribution contract 5 additional Marvel movies' foreign distribution.

In 2009, Marvel attempted to hire a team of writers to help come up with creative ways to launch its lesser-known properties, such as Black Panther, Cable, Iron Fist, Nighthawk, and Vision. In early 2009, Sony returned all Spider-Man television rights (including live-action) in exchange for an adjustment to the movie rights.

Disney conglomerate subsidiary

On December 31, 2009, The Walt Disney Company purchased Marvel Entertainment for $4 billion. Both Marvel and Disney stated that the merger would not affect any preexisting deals with other film studios for the time being, although Disney said they would distribute future Marvel projects with their own studio once the deals expired.

In April 2010, rumors circulated that Marvel was looking to create $20–40 million movies based on properties such as Doctor Strange, Ka-Zar, Luke Cage, Dazzler, and Power Pack. Kevin Feige responded by saying, while budgets are generally never discussed early in development, Marvel was considering films for all characters mentioned in the rumor, except Dazzler, whose rights were at Fox.

In June 2010, Marvel Entertainment set up a television division within Marvel Studios, headed up by Jeph Loeb as Executive Vice President, under which Marvel Animation would be operated. On October 18, Walt Disney Studios Motion Pictures acquired the distribution rights for The Avengers and Iron Man 3 from Paramount Pictures with Paramount's logo and credit remaining on those films.

On August 22, 2011, at Disney's behest, the Studio dismissed most of its marketing department: Dana Precious, EVP of Worldwide Marketing; Jeffrey Stewart, VP of Worldwide Marketing and Jodi Miller, Manager of Worldwide Marketing. Disney markets Marvel's films. In April 2012, The Walt Disney Company China, Marvel Studios and DMG Entertainment announced an agreement to co-produce Iron Man 3 in China. DMG partly financed, produced in China with Marvel, and handled co-production matters. DMG also distributed the film in China in tandem with Disney.

In April 2013, Marvel Studios moved its executive production offices from Manhattan Beach Studios Media Campus to the Walt Disney Studios in Burbank, California.

On July 2, 2013, Disney purchased the distribution rights to Iron Man, Iron Man 2, Thor and Captain America: The First Avenger from Paramount. In September 2014, TNT acquired the cable rights for Avengers: Age of Ultron, Captain America: Civil War, and three other films, to air on the network two years after their theatrical releases. The films had previously aired on FX since 2008.

Walt Disney Studios subsidiary
In August 2015, Marvel Studios was placed into Walt Disney Studios, with Feige reporting directly to Walt Disney Studios chairman Alan Horn instead of Marvel Entertainment CEO Isaac Perlmutter. Marvel Television and subsidiary Marvel Animation were left under Marvel Entertainment and Perlmutter's control.  As of April 2017, Marvel Studios was housed on the second floor of the Frank G. Wells Building at the Disney studio lot. Fast Company ranked Marvel Studios number eleven on its 2018 World's Most Innovative Companies list.

In September 2018, it was reported that Marvel Studios was developing several limited series for the streaming service Disney+, to be centered on "second tier" characters from the MCU films who had not and were unlikely to star in their own films. Characters being considered for series included Loki and Scarlet Witch, with the actors who portrayed the characters in the films expected to reprise their roles for the limited series. Each series was expected to be six to eight episodes, with a "hefty [budget] rivaling those of a major studio productions". The series would be produced by Marvel Studios rather than Marvel Television, with Feige taking a "hands-on role" in each series' development.

In October 2019, Feige was given the title of Chief Creative Officer, Marvel, and would oversee the creative direction of Marvel Television and Marvel Family Entertainment, with both being returned to being under the Marvel Studios banner. Two months later, Marvel Television was folded into Marvel Studios, with Marvel Studios overseeing development of all the Marvel Television series in production at the time of its closing. Karim Zreik, Marvel Television's senior vice president current programming and production, would join Marvel Studios alongside his team to oversee production of the Marvel Television series inherited by Marvel Studios.

In May 2022, Marvel Studios signed a 20-year licensing deal with Stan Lee Universe to license the name and likeness of Lee for use in future films, television series, Disney theme parks and cruises, various "experiences", and merchandizing. A digitally recreated Lee was not expected to make cameo appearances in future projects, rather the deal allows Marvel to use Lee's name, voice, likeness, signature, and existing images and archival material.

Marvel Studios Animation
In July 2021, ahead of the studio's first animated series What If...?, executive vice president of film production Victoria Alonso noted that Marvel Studios was creating an "animation branch and mini studio" to focus on more animated content beyond What If...?. Marvel Studios will outsource the animation for its animated series to third-party animation studios, though executive Brad Winderbaum indicated Marvel would work with fellow Disney studios Pixar and Walt Disney Animation Studios "under the right circumstances". In September 2021, Alonso was promoted to President of Physical, Post Production, VFX and Animation. In November 2021, Marvel Studios announced the animated series X-Men '97, which would be a revival of the 1990s animated series X-Men and set in that series' continuity. The animation branch of Marvel Studios and "mini studio" is known as Marvel Studios Animation.

By April 2022, Marvel Studios had taken over production of the preschool animated series Spidey and His Amazing Friends, starting from its second season; the first season was produced under the Marvel Entertainment banner.

Character rights 
Marvel had licensed out the film rights to many of their characters to other studios in the 1990s, starting with the X-Men, Fantastic Four, Spider-Man, Daredevil and later Captain America, Iron Man, Thor, Hulk, Ant-Man, the Wasp, Black Widow, Luke Cage, Punisher, Blade, Ghost Rider, Man-Thing, Black Panther and Deadpool among others.

In February 2015, Marvel Studios and Sony Pictures Entertainment announced that Spider-Man would appear in the Marvel Cinematic Universe, with the character appearing in Captain America: Civil War and Sony releasing Spider-Man: Homecoming produced by Feige and Amy Pascal on July 7, 2017. As part of the deal, Sony Pictures would continue to finance, distribute, own and have final creative control of the Spider-Man films. In June 2015, Feige clarified that the initial Sony deal did not allow Spider-Man to appear in any of the MCU television series, as it was "very specific... with a certain amount of back and forth allowed."

In September 2019, it was announced that Disney and Sony had reached a new agreement allowing for Spider-Man to appear in a third standalone film (produced by Marvel Studios and Feige) and a future Marvel Studios film. Disney was reported to be co-financing 25% of the film in exchange for 25% of the film's profits in the new agreement, while retaining the merchandising rights to the character. In November 2021, Pascal announced plans for a fourth Spider-Man film set in the MCU, in addition to long-term plans for a new trilogy of films with Marvel Studios, with said film entering active development the following month.

In March 2023, Citigroup financial analyst Jason Bazinet felt Disney may try to include the distribution rights to Hulk and Namor in any potential sale of the streaming service Hulu to Comcast, the owner of Universal Pictures through NBCUniversal.

The following table details the rights that have returned to Marvel along with the studios from which they returned and the year in which they returned.

Marvel Knights

Named after corporate sibling Marvel Comics' imprint of the same name, Marvel Knights is also the name given to a production arm of Marvel Studios intended to be used to produce some of Marvel's darker and lesser known titles. The first film produced under the Marvel Knights banner was Punisher: War Zone, the 2008 release that rebooted the Punisher franchise. In 2011, Ghost Rider: Spirit of Vengeance was the second and final title to be released under the Marvel Knights banner.

Units
 MVL Productions LLC: film slate subsidiary
 Marvel Studios Animation
 Marvel Television (2010-2019) a unit label used for Marvel television series.
 Marvel Animation, Inc. (June 2004; 2008–2020) subsidiary charged with oversight of Marvel's animation productions outside the MCU.
 Marvel Animation Studios (2012–2020)
 MLG Productions (2006–2011) Marvel & Lionsgate's subsidiary group for Marvel Animated Features

Key people
Studio heads:
 Kevin Feige, president
 Louis D'Esposito, co-president
 Victoria Alonso, president of physical, post production, VFX and animation (formerly Executive Vice President of Production)

The following executives are referred to as the "Marvel Studios Parliament":

 Stephen Broussard, Executive, Production and Development
 Eric Hauserman Carroll, Executive, Production and Development (formerly Director of Development)
 Nate Moore, Vice President of Production and Development
 Jonathan Schwartz, Vice President of Production and Development
 Trinh Tran, Executive, Production and Development
 Brad Winderbaum, Head of Streaming, Television and Animation (formerly a Vice President of Production and Development)

Additionally, a number of other executives serve as lead producers on films and television series, working on each project from their inception through their release, as part of the Production and Development group. Some of these executives include:

 Sana Amanat

 Grant Curtis

 Brian Gay, Director of Production & Development (formerly Feige's Executive Coordinator)

Other key executives include:
 Dana Vasquez-Eberhardt, Vice President of Animation
 Ryan Meinerding, Head of Visual Development and Character Design (formerly Visual Development Supervisor)

 Andy Park, Director of Visual Development and Production Illustrator
 Russell Bobbitt, property master

Former key executives include:
 David Maisel, former Chairman, and before that vice-chairman, president and chief operating officer.
 Avi Arad, founder and former Chairman and CEO.
 Jeremy Latcham, former SVP Production and Development
 Karim Zreik, former SVP of Original Programming and Production for Marvel Television Studios.

Additionally, Sarah Halley Finn has served as a frequent casting director for several MCU films and television series.

Logo

Films and television series 

Starting with the release of Spider-Man in 2002, Marvel Studios introduced its "flipbook" production logo, created by Imaginary Forces. This logo was accompanied with music from the film's score, sound effects or a song, to lead into the beginning of the film. This was the logo seen in front of all films until 2013, when the logo was updated with the release of Thor: The Dark World, again created by Imaginary Forces. Kevin Feige stated that since Marvel was now their own entity within the Walt Disney Company, it "felt like the time to update it and have something that is more substantial as a standalone logo in front of our features" instead of having it be accompanied by Marvel's studio or distribution partners' logos. Feige added that "We didn't want to re-invent the wheel [with the new logo], but we wanted it to feel bigger, to feel more substantial, which is why it starts with the flip, but suddenly it's more dimensional as we go through the lettering and it reveals itself with the metallic sheen before settling into the white-on-red, well known Marvel logo, with the added flourish of the arrival and the announcement of the Studios at the bottom of the word Marvel." Imaginary Forces used the same animation technique on the updated logo, as they did when they created the first version in 2002. They were given a few hundred comic books to select images from, ultimately choosing 120 that were "universal and not specific to one character" and created a narrative "where each image spoke to the one before it and after."

The new logo appeared on all subsequent studio productions set within the Marvel Cinematic Universe through Captain America: Civil War. With the addition of the new logo, Marvel Studios also added a fanfare to accompany the logo, composed by Brian Tyler, who wrote the scores to Iron Man 3, Thor: The Dark World, and Avengers: Age of Ultron. It was featured on the films Thor: The Dark World, Captain America: The Winter Soldier, and Guardians of the Galaxy.

In July 2016, another new logo and opening were introduced, featuring an updated fanfare, composed this time by Michael Giacchino, who first worked with Marvel Studios on the score to Doctor Strange. The new opening begins with comic book panels seen in the previous two openings, but transitions into footage and art of the characters from the Marvel Cinematic Universe films. It was first seen in front of Doctor Strange. The updated logo was created by Perception, who were first approached in January 2016 by Marvel to update their logo. Feige specifically requested Perception "to combine the brand and the iconic characters into a single image, showcasing the heroes within the letterforms of the Marvel logo." The Perception team settled on a concept they dubbed "How to Build a Universe", which "was designed to pay tribute to [the film making] process by touching on" how a film's origins is inspired by the comics, which then results in a script, followed by concept art, resulting in the final film. Perception looked to the initial "flipbook" logo for inspiration, and paid tribute to it in the new opening, as it opens identically to the flipbook logo. Next, the opening includes "various lines lifted directly from the script pages of various Marvel screenplays", with Perception picking "both iconic fan-favorites, as well as lines that helped establish the breadth of the Marvel Universe." To add in the concept art images, Perception looked "through a massive archive of concept art and "The Art Of..." books, to select the most iconic images for each beloved character. Utilizing the original digital paintings themselves, the Perception team animated each image being painted from scratch. The final touch was mapping this artwork onto 3D models to giving these once 2D paintings a sense of depth as the camera moves around them." Finally, over 70 pieces of footage from the 13 films that had released at that time were included, with Perception arranging them in a way they called the "vault" "where luminescent footage plays on the interior walls of the "Marvel" logotype."

A modified version of Perception's logo was introduced at the 2017 D23 Expo to commemorate the 10th anniversary of the MCU. The logo debuted with Avengers: Infinity War on April 26, 2018, and was used again in Ant-Man and the Wasp. With the release of Captain Marvel, the current Perception logo was altered at Marvel Studios' behest in honor of Stan Lee; Lee died on November 12, 2018, just a few months before the release of the film. The logo was altered, replacing the characters with Stan Lee's MCU cameos and other public appearances related to the MCU, accompanied by a black screen reading "Thank You Stan". Similarly, the logo was modified for the Disney+ version of Black Panther and its sequel, Black Panther: Wakanda Forever in honor of Chadwick Boseman, who died on August 28, 2020. The logo was altered, replacing the characters with images and footage of T'Challa and Boseman. The logo premiered on November 29, 2020, which would have been Boseman's 44th birthday.

Television specials 
Television specials from Marvel Studios, which are marketed as "Marvel Studios Special Presentation", feature a special multicolored intro with bongo drum music, reminiscent of the CBS Special Presentation theme featured before animated holiday specials of the 1980s and 1990s. The intro was also designed by Perception, with Giacchino (who directed and composed for the special Werewolf by Night) once again creating the music. Jamie Lovett at ComicBook.com called the Marvel Studios Special Presentation intro "more colorful" and its fanfare "more playful" than the normal Marvel Studios intro.

Production library

Films

Short films

Live-action

Animated

Television

Animated

Live-action

Documentary

See also
 List of films based on Marvel Comics publications
 Outline of the Marvel Cinematic Universe
 List of unproduced Marvel Comics adaptations
 DC Studios

Notes

References

External links

 

 
1993 establishments in California
American companies established in 1993
Companies based in Burbank, California
Companies that filed for Chapter 11 bankruptcy in 1996
Films based on Marvel Comics
Disney production studios
Disney acquisitions
Walt Disney Studios (division)
The Walt Disney Company subsidiaries
2009 mergers and acquisitions
Marvel Entertainment
Mass media companies established in 1993
Articles containing video clips
Film production companies of the United States